Mikel Oyarzabal Ugarte (born 21 April 1997) is a Spanish professional footballer who plays as a left winger or forward for La Liga club Real Sociedad and the Spain national team.

He has spent his entire professional career with Real Sociedad, making over 250 appearances and scoring over 80 goals. He won the 2020 Copa del Rey with the club, scoring in the final.

Oyarzabal made his full debut for the Spain national team in 2016, representing the side at UEFA Euro 2020.

Club career
Born in Eibar, Gipuzkoa, Oyarzabal joined Real Sociedad's youth setup in 2011, aged 14. While still a junior, he made his senior debut with the reserves on 15 November 2014, coming on as a second-half substitute in a 3–2 away win against SD Amorebieta in the Segunda División B.

On 20 September 2015, Oyarzabal scored his first senior goals, scoring twice in a 5–0 away rout of CD Mensajero. He made his first-team and La Liga debut on 25 October, replacing Carlos Vela in the dying minutes of a 4–0 victory at Levante UD.

Oyarzabal scored his first goal for Real Sociedad on 8 February 2016 in a 5–0 away win over RCD Espanyol. Six days later, shortly after having extended his contract until 2021, he scored two goals to help defeat Granada CF 3–0 at the Anoeta Stadium.

 
On 19 August 2016, Oyarzabal again renewed his contract until 2022. He featured in all 38 league matches over the season, as the San Sebastián-based team came sixth and returned to the UEFA Europa League after a two-year absence.

Oyarzabal made his European debut on 19 October 2017, scoring in a 6–0 thrashing of Macedonia's FK Vardar in the Europa League group stage; his team made it to the last 32, with him scoring an own goal in a 4–3 aggregate loss to FC Red Bull Salzburg. On the domestic front he scored 12 goals, including two in a 5–0 win against Girona FC on 8 April 2018.

On 5 October 2018, Oyarzabal scored his first goals since May of that year, two penalties in a 3–1 away victory over Athletic Bilbao in the Basque derby. Athletic Bilbao had tried to sign him in the summer transfer window, but he had rejected their approach in favour of signing a new contract with Real Sociedad to run until 2024.

In the 2019–20 Copa del Rey, Oyarzabal scored a penalty in each leg of a 3–1 aggregate defeat of CD Mirandés as his team reached the final for the first time since 1988. On 10 July that year, he achieved his 50th goal for the club in a 3–2 home defeat against Granada, and on 3 October while still 23 he scored a penalty in his 200th match in a 3–0 win over Getafe CF.

On 3 April 2021, Oyarzabal scored the only goal of the delayed 2020 Copa del Rey Final, also through a penalty, to help Real Sociedad clinch their first in 34 years after beating Athletic Bilbao. In March 2022 he ruptured the anterior cruciate ligament of his left knee during a training session, potentially ruling him out for the rest of that year. He returned on 31 December as a late substitute in a 2–0 home win over CA Osasuna, and two weeks later scored his first goal since his recovery to conclude a 3–1 victory against Athletic at the same venue; it was his sixth goal (four from the spot) in 14 games against the rivals.

International career

Spain

Oyarzabal represented Spain at under-18, under-19 and under-21 levels. On 17 May 2016, aged 19, he was called up to the full squad for a friendly against Bosnia and Herzegovina. Twelve days later, he replaced Nolito (who had scored) at the hour mark of the 3–1 win.

On 10 June 2019, Oyarzabal scored his first goal, in a 3–0 victory over Sweden in the UEFA Euro 2020 qualifiers. In May 2021, he was included in Luis Enrique's 24-man squad for the finals. As a late substitute, he scored the last goal of a 5–3 extra time win against Croatia in the last 16. In the following round, he scored the last attempt of a penalty shootout defeat of Switzerland (1–1 after 120 minutes).

Oyarzabal was also selected for the Olympic team due to compete in Tokyo in 2021. He scored three times for the runners-up, including once in the 2–1 final loss to Brazil.

In the 2021 UEFA Nations League Final against France on 10 October, Oyarzabal scored the opening goal of the match, although Spain ultimately suffered a 2–1 defeat.

Basque Country
Oyarzabal has also featured for the unofficial Basque national team, scoring on his debut to cap a 3–1 win over Tunisia at the San Mamés Stadium on 30 December 2016.

Personal life
Oyarzabal combined his early professional career with studying for a Business degree at the University of Deusto.

Career statistics

Club

International

 Spain score listed first, score column indicates score after each Oyarzabal goal.

Honours

Club
Real Sociedad
Copa del Rey: 2019–20

International
Spain U21
UEFA European Under-21 Championship: 2019; runner-up: 2017

Spain U23
Summer Olympics silver medal: 2020

Spain
UEFA Nations League runner-up: 2020–21

Individual
La Liga Player of the Month: October 2020

References

External links

Real Sociedad official profile

1997 births
Living people
Spanish footballers
Footballers from Eibar
Association football wingers
Association football forwards
La Liga players
Segunda División B players
Real Sociedad B footballers
Real Sociedad footballers
Spain youth international footballers
Spain under-21 international footballers
Spain under-23 international footballers
Spain international footballers
UEFA Euro 2020 players
Olympic footballers of Spain
Footballers at the 2020 Summer Olympics
Olympic medalists in football
Olympic silver medalists for Spain
Medalists at the 2020 Summer Olympics
Basque Country international footballers
University of Deusto alumni